Norman Frederick Morris (26 February 1920 – 29 February 2008) was a British pioneer of women's health. He was a professor of obstetrics and gynaecology at Charing Cross Hospital Medical School (1958–1985) and was also a university administrator. From 1971 to 1980, he was dean of medicine, and then deputy vice-chancellor at the University of London.  However his greatest contribution was to question current standards of prenatal care. He was critical of the way that midwives and obstetricians treated women, and his work was summarized in a paper in the Lancet in 1960. This paper was based on  interviews with 500 women, included no references and at the time was extremely controversial. In 2007, the Lancet included this paper in the '200 most important publications in the Lancet'.

Early life and education
Morris was born in 1920 in Luton. His father, Frederick, was a Nalgo shop steward. His mother Evelyn was a teacher and was a great influence in his life. He was headboy of Dunstable Grammar School and was selected by Lord Moran to become a medical student at St Mary's Hospital Medical School. It was at St Mary's, he was taught and guided by the Medical Reformer Alec  Bourne, the Gynaecologist responsible for the Abortion Act.   He  spent the early war years as an ARP warden with Sir Alexander Fleming. After qualification, he worked in Amersham and then in the East End of London.

Career
Morris held junior posts in obstetrics and gynaecology at St Mary's. He was first assistant at Hammersmith Hospital and became reader at University College Hospital. In 1958, he was appointed professor of obstetrics and gynaecology. He was the first clinical professor at Charing Cross.

His initial research interest was hypertension in pregnancy. He published a series of papers on uterine blood flow and was the first obstetrician to show that there was reduced blood flow in the uterus in women who subsequently developed pre-eclampsia.

At Charing Cross he developed a clinical and basic science research programme. He was the first obstetrician to introduce fathers to the labour ward and built a labour ward without the traditional first and second stage rooms. Staff were encouraged to attend Balint style department meetings. He worked closely with Emanual Lewis, a psychiatrist and pediatrician Dr Hugh Jolly. SANDS was founded from these meetings. The first water birth was carried out at Charing Cross in the 1970s. Dr Frederick Leboyer came to work with Morris. Charing Cross moved from its base in Covent Carden to West London in 1972, where major changes in obstetric care were developed.

He was also a campaigner for medical academics and established AUCAS. a pressure group that achieved parity of pay for university doctors.  He set up a campaign to allow Jewish doctors from Russia to emigrate and develop careers in the UK and Israel. He trained professors in the UK, America, Europe and India. He was a founder and first president  of the International Society of Psychosomatic Obstetrics and Gynaecology. He was president of the Division of the Obstetrics and Gynaecology Section at the Royal Society of Medicine and the West London Medico-Chirological Society. He was deputy chairman of the Northwest Thames Health Authority and chairman of the regional research committee. He was the deputy chair of the Flowers Report. He was a visiting professor to 27 universities.

He retired from the National Health Service (NHS) in 1985 and became medical director of the IVF unit at Cromwell Hospital. He was the director of the Commonwealth Health secretariat. At age 80, he established postgraduate courses for the MRCS and the MRCP. He continued to work until his death in 2008.

Personal life
In 1944, as a junior doctor, he met Dr Benjamin Rivlin, a local GP, originally from Latvia. In 1945, he married Rivlin's daughter Lucy. The couple were married for over 60 years and had four children, all of whom became doctors.

His life was celebrated at the Royal College of Obstetricians in 2008; speakers included politician Tony Benn, and diplomat Emeka Anyoka. The eulogy was read by Australian actor and comedian Barry Humphries (in the guise of Dame Edna Everage).

Works or publications
 
 The Lancet, Volume 275, Issue 7130, Pages 913–915, 23 April 1960

References

External links
 Obituary at "The Independent"
 Biography at *"The Lancet"

1920 births
2008 deaths
British obstetricians
British gynaecologists
Academics of the University of London
Social Democratic Party (UK) politicians